Thomas Jefferson Boynton (August 31, 1838 – May 2, 1871) was a United States district judge of the United States District Court for the Southern District of Florida.

Education and career

Born on August 31, 1838, in Amherst, Ohio, Boynton read law in 1858. He entered private practice in St. Joseph, Missouri from 1858 to 1861. He was a correspondent for the Missouri Democrat from 1858 to 1861. He was a newspaper editor in Jefferson City, Missouri. He was the United States Attorney for the Southern District of Florida from 1861 to 1863.

Federal judicial service

Boynton received a recess appointment from President Abraham Lincoln on October 19, 1863, to a seat on the United States District Court for the Southern District of Florida vacated by Judge William Marvin. He was nominated to the same position by President Lincoln on January 5, 1864. He was confirmed by the United States Senate on January 20, 1864, and received his commission the same day. His service terminated on January 1, 1870, due to his resignation.

Death

Boynton died on May 2, 1871, in New York City, New York.

References

Sources
 

1838 births
1871 deaths
Judges of the United States District Court for the Southern District of Florida
United States federal judges appointed by Abraham Lincoln
19th-century American judges
United States federal judges admitted to the practice of law by reading law
People from Amherst, Ohio